BC Tsmoki Minsk II is the reserve team of BC Tsmoki-Minsk, a professional basketball club that is based in Minsk, Belarus. The team plays in the Belarus Premier League.

Season by season

External links

Basketball teams in Belarus
Sport in Minsk
Basketball teams established in 2006
2006 establishments in Belarus